Katinkan-e Bala (also Romanized as Katīnkān-e Bālā; also known as Kātīhīkān, Katihkān, Katīkān, Katīkan-e Bālā, and Katīnkān) is a village in Zaboli Rural District, in the Central District of Mehrestan County, Sistan and Baluchestan Province, Iran. At the 2006 census, its population was 55, in 13 families.

References 

Populated places in Mehrestan County